Alan or Allan Harris may refer to:
 Alan Harris (playwright), Welsh playwright
 Allan Harris (musician) (born 1956), American jazz vocalist, guitarist, and songwriter
 Alan Harris (illustrator) (born 1957), British bird illustrator
 Allan Harris (1942–2017), English footballer
 Alan Harris (The Messengers), fictional character
 Alan W. Harris (born 1944), American planetary scientist and asteroid lightcurve expert
 Sir Alan Harris (engineer) (1916–2000), English structural engineer

See also
 Alan Harris Nevas (born 1928), American judge
 Al Harris (disambiguation)